Lionel Hampton Presents Buddy Rich is a jazz album recorded by Buddy Rich and released by the Who's Who in Jazz record label in 1977. The album has been re-issued by different labels under different names including, Buddy's Cherokee, The Lionel Hampton Sessions and Sounds of Jazz Vol. 10.

Track listing 
LP side A:
 "Moment's Notice" (John Coltrane) – 5:28
 "Giant Steps" (John Coltrane) – 5:32
 "Buddy's Cherokee" (Buddy Rich, Lionel Hampton) – 7:26
LP side B:
 "Take the 'A' Train" (Billy Strayhorn) – 6:13
 "I'll Never Be the Same" (Gus Kahn, Matty Malneck, Frank Signorelli) – 3:33
 "Latin Silk" (Paul Moen) – 7:38

Bonus tracks added to some later re-issues:
"Buddy's Rock" (Buddy Rich) – 5:54
"My Funny Valentine" (Richard Rodgers, Lorenz Hart) – 6:00
"Hamp, Rich, Dido Blues" (Jon Hendricks) – 4:53

Personnel 
 Buddy Rich – drums
 Lionel Hampton – vibraphone
 Barry Keiner – piano
 Tom Warrington – bass
 Candido Camero – congas
 Steve Marcus – tenor saxophone
 Gary Pribek – saxophone
 Paul Moen – tenor saxophone
 Jon Hendricks – vocals on "Hamp, Rich, Dido Blues"

References 

 Who's Who in Jazz WWLP 21006 (1977 LP) (also Philips (France) 9123602)
 Kingdom Gate 7011 (1983 UK LP)
 Who's Who in Jazz D2 72205 (1994 CD)
 Galaxy Sound of Jazz 388610 (NL, 1999 CD re-issue, Vol 10)
 Giants of Jazz Recordings CD 53354 (2000 CD)
 Lionel Hampton Presents... at discogs.com

1977 albums
Buddy Rich albums
Who's Who in Jazz albums